The 12123 / 12124 Deccan Queen is a daily Indian passenger train service operated by the Central Railway zone of the Indian Railways connecting the cities of Mumbai and Pune. Introduced on June 1, 1930, the Deccan Queen was India's "first superfast train, first long-distance electric-hauled train, first vestibuled train, the first train to have a ‘women-only’ car, and the first train to feature a dining car". The service name comes from the Marathi nickname "" (Queen of the Deccan), a popular nickname for Pune. Deccan Queen is currently the fastest train service linking Chhatrapati Shivaji Maharaj Terminus and Pune Junction. The train's long history and common use as a commuter train has gained it significant popularity, including annual celebrations of its "birthday" on June 1 at Pune Junction. It was hauled by a Kalyan-based WCAM-3 end to end up until June 2022. From June 2022, its upgraded coaches in a new livery are being hauled by a Ajni-based WAP-7.

History 
Deccan Queen service was introduced on 1 June 1930 as a weekend train with two rakes of seven coaches each. The first service of the train was conducted from Calyan (now Kalyan) and Pune in the Bombay Presidency, British India, apparently in order to ferry rich patrons from Bombay (now Mumbai) to Poona (now Pune) to attend horse racing at Pune Race Course.

Initially, one coach was painted in silver with scarlet mouldings, while the others were painted in royal blue with gold lines. The underframes of the coaches of the original rakes were built in England, while the coach bodies were built in the Matunga Workshop of the Great Indian Peninsula Railway. The service initially included first and second class seating, but the first class was replaced by a redesigned second class on January 1, 1949, until third class seating was introduced in June 1955. In 1966, the coaches were replaced by "anti-telescopic, steel-bodied integral coaches" built by Integral Coach Factory, PeramburChennai, and the rake was lengthened to twelve coaches. Third class seating was re-designated second-class seating in April 1974.

The Deccan Queen is also one of the most favourite trains among railfans. Every year on 1 June, its regular pass-holders, railfans and railway authorities celebrate the train's birthday. Deccan Queen entered its 90th year of service on 1 June 2019.

On 19 August 2020, Central Railways announced an allocation of brand new LHB coach coupled with a simultaneous introduction of a unique culturally significant "Green-Brown-Yellow" curvilinear stripe livery on all of the coaches of Deccan Queen. The unique new livery has been finalized after numerous consultations with commuters as well as Design Engineers. The new livery features a dark green-colored main background, with brown and yellow curvilinear stripes, that run from the right end of the coach and end at 2/3rds of the length of the coach thereby giving the rake a unique GenZ look that is bound to make heads turn in conjunction with eyebrows raised. In addition, a selection of such a dark Green livery would ensure that the train's color does not get adversely impacted at the time of the Indian Monsoon. This train will now run with an introduction of push–pull Technology and head-on generation-equipped WAP-7 three-phase electric locomotives of Kalyan Electric Loco Shed, which will also have the same livery as the rest of the train. The unique Dine-in pantry car of this legendary train will still be retained although in a fresh new LHB avatar.

Incidents
On 29 December 1953, Bombay-bound Deccan Queen collided at Masjid Bunder station with another local train at 1025 hours on 29 December 1953. Five persons received grievous injuries and 42 others minor ones. The approximate cost of damage to railway property was Rs. 12,600. The Government Inspector of Railways, Bombay, held his statutory enquiry into this accident. His Provisional Finding is that the accident was caused by the failure on the part of the Driver of the Deccan Queen.

The train derailed in 1990 at Khandala Ghat, casualties were not reported.

The train service was disturbed between late July to early August 2005 due to heavy rainfall in Mumbai (26 July 2005).

On 30 November 2006, a mob of around 6,000 protestors set fire to some coaches of the train near Ulhasnagar after forcing the passengers to get down. The arsonists were protesting against the vandalism of a statue of B. R. Ambedkar in far away Kanpur though the incident had nothing to do with the Deccan Queen.

Schedule 
This service consists of two routes:

 12124 Pune–Mumbai Deccan Queen leaves Pune Junction every day at 0715 hrs IST and reaches Mumbai CSMT at 1025 hrs IST. The train travels non-stop till Lonavala after leaving Pune junction. On its way the train overtakes Sahyadri Express at Shivajinagar / . Then it crosses the Bhor ghat and skips Karjat. The train then stops at Dadar (Central) station after traveling  from Lonavala and finally terminates at Mumbai CSMT. It is the second (out of six) Pune–Mumbai trains to leave Pune Junction in the morning.
 12123 Mumbai–Pune Deccan Queen leaves Mumbai CSMT every day at 1710 hrs IST and reaches Pune Junction at 2025 hrs IST. On its way the train halts at  after covering  from Mumbai CSMT for bank locomotive attachment. Then it halts at  after crossing Bhor Ghat where bank locomotives are detached. It is the second to last daily Mumbai–Pune train to leave CSMT in the evening.

Due to the suburban network, Deccan Queen's arrival in Mumbai is affected by up to 30 minutes. However, it is still the fastest train between Pune and Mumbai CSMT.

Train

Rake 

Initially this train ran with two different rakes: one colored silver with scarlet moldings and other royal blue, both manufactured  England. Only First Class and Second Class were used in seven-coach rake till June 1955 after which Third Class was also introduced. Initially there were seven coaches which were increased to 12.

Eventually, the train used  ICF coach manufactured i India. This train had 17 coaches which included different classes like AC chair car, MST coaches (Monthly Season Ticket), Ladies special, Second class sitter, Reserved coaches and General Coaches.

In June 2021, the train was upgraded to 17 LHB coach also manufactured in India under Project Utkrisht. These coaches have LED lights, Bio toilets and Braille Signage. GPS-tagged biometric attendance system were also installed in this train. Eventually, the consist was reduced to 15 LHB coach This included a Dining Car which is ISO certified.

 
Mumbai CSMT–Pune Junction

 Pune Junction–Mumbai CSMT

Locomotives 

When it was introduced in 1930, the Deccan Queen was hauled by WCP 1/2 DC passenger locomotives. From 1954 till the 1990s, it was hauled by a WCM-1/2/4/5 DC mixed locomotive. From the 1990s till present, it has been hauled end to end by a WCAM-3 or WCAM-2/2P DC/AC locomotive of the Kalyan shed. Starting 1 June 2018, on its 88th anniversary, it will be occasionally hauled by the WAP-7 of the Ajni shed.

At , it gets two or three WAG-5, WAG-7, WCAM-2 or WCAM-3 bankers of Kalyan shed to push the train on the ghat section between Karjat railway station and Lonavala railway station, where the gradient is of 1 in 40.

Sister trains 
 Dedicated Intercity trains of India:

See also
 Mumbai–Pune Passenger
 Flying Ranee
 Flying Mail

References

External links 
 Classic Trains of India: Deccan Queen by S. Shankar

Express trains in India
Transport in Pune
Railway services introduced in 1930
Rail transport in Maharashtra
Mumbai–Pune trains
Transport in Mumbai